Zdeněk Jarkovský (3 October 1918 in Nový Bydžov, Austria-Hungary – 8 November 1948 in La Manche) was an ice hockey goaltender for the Czechoslovak national team. He won a silver medal at the 1948 Winter Olympics.

He died when in an airplane disaster when the airplane with Czechoslovakia ice hockey national team fell into the English Channel on the flight from Paris to London.

References

External links

1918 births
1948 deaths
Ice hockey players at the 1948 Winter Olympics
Olympic ice hockey players of Czechoslovakia
Olympic medalists in ice hockey
Olympic silver medalists for Czechoslovakia
People from Nový Bydžov
Medalists at the 1948 Winter Olympics
Victims of aviation accidents or incidents in Europe
Victims of aviation accidents or incidents in international waters
Sportspeople from the Hradec Králové Region
Czech ice hockey goaltenders
Czechoslovak ice hockey goaltenders
Victims of aviation accidents or incidents in 1948